The 2004 United States presidential election in Virginia took place on November 2, 2004, and was part of the 2004 United States presidential election. Voters chose 13 representatives, or electors to the Electoral College, who voted for president and vice president.

Virginia was won by incumbent President George W. Bush by an 8.20% margin of victory. Prior to the election, all 12 news organizations considered this a state Bush would win, or otherwise a red state. The state had voted for the Republican candidate in all presidential elections since 1952 except for 1964's Democratic landslide. This pattern continued in 2004, although it would be broken four years later by the Democratic victory in 2008.

, the 2004 election is the last time that Virginia has voted for the Republican candidate in a presidential election. This was also the last time Buchanan County and Dickenson County would vote Democratic for president; and the last time Loudoun County, Prince William County, and Henrico County, and the independent Cities of Winchester, Radford, Staunton, Harrisonburg, Manassas, Suffolk, Hopewell, and Manassas Park, would vote Republican for president. As of 2020, this is the last time Virginia has voted to the right of Florida, which remained a traditional bellwether state as Virginia transitioned from safely red to safely blue; as well as the last time Virginia has voted to the right of Missouri or Ohio, two Midwestern bellwether states that were either in the process of becoming more safely red or would soon begin doing so.

Bush became the first Republican to win the White House without carrying Fairfax County since Calvin Coolidge in 1924.

Primaries 
Virginia Democratic primary, 2004

Campaign

Predictions

There were 12 news organizations who made state-by-state predictions of the election. Here are their last predictions before election day.

Polling
Bush won every single pre-election poll. The final 3 poll average showed Bush leading 50% to 45%.

Fundraising
Bush raised $8,594,386. Kerry raised $6,125,128.

Advertising and visits
Neither campaign advertised or visited this state during the fall election.

Analysis
For about 80 years after the Civil War, Virginia was, like most other former Confederate states, a reliably Democratic state at the presidential level. After the passage of civil rights legislation in the mid-1960s and the ensuing "Southern strategy," Virginia turned strongly Republican at the presidential level, being the only former Confederate state to vote for Gerald Ford over Jimmy Carter in 1976. Much of the Republican strength in the state was based in the large and growing Richmond- and Washington, D.C.-area suburbs of Henrico, Chesterfield, and Fairfax Counties. This trend would start to change in the 2000s; although Bush was widely expected to carry Virginia and did prevail in the state by over 8%, this election set the stage for the state to become more competitive on the presidential level in the future.

Though the state was uncontested by both campaigns,  John Kerry became the first Democrat since 1964 to carry Fairfax County, long a key Republican stronghold in the state and the largest county in the state. However, Bush managed to keep the margin in Virginia roughly unchanged with respect to 2000 by making further inroads in rural Virginia, particularly in southwest Virginia, a heavily unionized region that had traditionally been one of the Democratic strongholds in the state. Bush became the first Republican to carry Russell County since 1972 and expanded his margin by over 10% in Washington, Scott, Wise, Lee, and Smyth Counties. These countervailing trends would continue in subsequent elections, with Democrats expanding their support in Fairfax County while Republicans showed increasing support in rural Virginia.

Results

By county 
These results combine counties and independent cities in Virginia.

Counties and independent cities that flipped from Democratic to Republican 
 Caroline (largest municipality: Bowling Green)
 Russell (largest municipality: Lebanon)
 Southampton (largest municipality: Courtland)
 Norton (independent city)
 Suffolk (independent city)

Counties and independent cities that flipped from Republican to Democratic
 Albemarle (largest municipality: Scottsville)
 Fairfax (largest municipality: Herndon)
 Nelson (largest municipality: Nellysford)
 Prince Edward (largest municipality: Farmville)
 Danville (independent city)
 Fairfax (independent city)
 Williamsburg (independent city)

By congressional district
Bush won 9 of 11 congressional districts, including one that elected a Democrat.

Electors

Technically the voters of Virginia cast their ballots for electors: representatives to the Electoral College. Virginia is allocated 13 electors because it has 11 congressional districts and 2 senators. All candidates who appear on the ballot or qualify to receive write-in votes must submit a list of 13 electors, who pledge to vote for their candidate and his or her running mate. Whoever wins the majority of votes in the state is awarded all 13 electoral votes. Their chosen electors then vote for president and vice president. Although electors are pledged to their candidate and running mate, they are not obligated to vote for them. An elector who votes for someone other than his or her candidate is known as a faithless elector.

The electors of each state and the District of Columbia met on December 13, 2004, to cast their votes for president and vice president. The Electoral College itself never meets as one body. Instead the electors from each state and the District of Columbia met in their respective capitols.

The following were the members of the Electoral College from the state. All 13 were pledged for Bush/Cheney:
Yvonne McGee McCoy
Loretta H. Tate
Theodore C. Brown
Woodrow Harris
Keith C. Drake
Wendell S. Walker
Peter E. Broadbent
Sean Michael Spicer
Lloyd C. Martin
Dorothy L. Simpson
Carlton John Davis
Charles E. Dane
Rebecca Anne Stoeckel

References

Virginia
2004
Presidential